The West Elk Wilderness is a U.S. Wilderness Area located northwest of Gunnison, Colorado in the West Elk Mountains.

History

The wilderness was established in 1964 and now protects  within the Gunnison National Forest.

Geography

The area supports large elk and deer populations and is busiest during the fall hunting season.

References

West Elk Mountains
Protected areas of Gunnison County, Colorado
Gunnison National Forest
1964 establishments in Colorado
Wilderness areas of Colorado
Protected areas established in 1964